Gerard Deulofeu Lázaro (born 13 March 1994) is a Spanish professional footballer who plays for Serie A club Udinese. Mainly a forward, he can also play as a winger on both flanks.

He started his career with Barcelona, first appearing with the first team at the age of 17, and was loaned to Everton and Sevilla before joining the former on a permanent deal in the summer of 2015. After a successful loan spell at Italian side AC Milan, he was brought back to Barcelona in June 2017, before being loaned to Watford in January 2018; later that year, Watford signed him outright.

Deulofeu was also a Spanish youth international, having represented the country over 80 times at under-16, under-17, under-19, under-20 and under-21 levels, being named the UEFA Under-19 Championship Golden Player in 2012. In 2014, he made his senior debut for the Spain national football team.

Club career

Barcelona
Born in Riudarenes, Girona, Catalonia, Deulofeu joined Barcelona's youth academy in 2003 at the age of nine. In 2005, he was promoted to the U-13 team. On 2 March 2011, still registered with the junior team, he made his senior debut, appearing for the B team in a 4–1 away win against Córdoba in Segunda División by coming on as a substitute for Edu Oriol in the 75th minute.

In late April 2011, Deulofeu was called up to the senior squad for the first time, for a La Liga match against Real Sociedad on 29 April, but did not leave the bench in a 2–1 away loss. On 29 October, he made his professional debut with the main squad, replacing Cesc Fàbregas in the 63rd minute of a 5–0 league home success against Mallorca. 

On 16 September 2012, Deulofeu scored his first goal for the B team, in a 2–1 away loss at Hércules. Deulofeu scored 18 goals for the B team in the 2012–13 season, joint-fourth in the second level competition. On 15 May 2013, he signed a professional contract with the Blaugrana first team, running until June 2017.

Everton (loan)
On 10 July 2013, Premier League club Everton signed Deulofeu on a season-long loan. The Liverpool Echo also reported that any loan fee would be waived if he made appearances in more than 50% of his new club's games. He scored on his debut for his new club, a 2–1 home win over Stevenage in the second round of the League Cup on 29 August.

On 30 November, Deulofeu scored his first league goal for the Toffees, netting the opener in a 4–0 home success against Stoke City. His second came eight days later, through an 85th-minute strike at Arsenal to earn a 1–1 draw.

On 14 December 2013, Deulofeu suffered a hamstring injury during Everton's 4–1 victory over Fulham, which sidelined him for five weeks. He scored his third and last goal on 15 March of the following year, netting the opener in a 2–1 home win over Cardiff City. He helped his team to record its best ever Premier League points tally of 72 to finish fifth and, at the end of the campaign, Barcelona confirmed that he would not be returning for a second loan spell as he had been promoted to their first-team squad; he wrote an open letter thanking the staff, players and fans for their support during his stay.

Sevilla (loan)

In May 2014, Deulofeu was granted a first-team place by new Barcelona manager Luis Enrique. However, on 14 August 2014, Sevilla reached an agreement with Barcelona for the loan of Deulofeu for the coming season, with the player admitting "surprise" at Enrique's decision.

After being an unused substitute in a 1–1 home draw against Valencia, Deulofeu made his debut on 30 August replacing Vitolo in the 73rd minute of a 2–1 away win against Espanyol. He made his UEFA Europa League debut on 18 September, starting and providing assists for both goals in a 2–0 home victory against Feyenoord.

On 24 September Deulofeu scored his first goal for the Andalusians (and also his first ever in the top flight in Spain), netting the game's winner in a home success over Real Sociedad. His loan was considered hugely unsuccessful, the Spanish newspaper Marca selected him in their La Liga 'Worst team of the season'.

Everton
Deulofeu joined Everton permanently on 1 July 2015, for a transfer fee reported to be £4.2 million. He scored his first goal as a permanent Everton player, a free kick at the Madejski Stadium, as they came from behind to win 2–1 against Reading in the third round of the League Cup. His first league goal since his transfer came on 1 November, the opening goal in a 6–2 rout of Sunderland.

AC Milan (loan)
On 23 January 2017, Deulofeu joined AC Milan on loan until the end of the 2016–17 season. Two days later, he made his debut with Milan in a Coppa Italia quarter-final match against Juventus, coming on as a substitute for Carlos Bacca in the 1–2 defeat. On 29 January, he made his league debut as a substitute for the injured Giacomo Bonaventura in a loss by the same score against Udinese. On 8 February, Deulofeu made his first assist, a low pass across the goalmouth towards Mario Pašalić, in a 0–1 away victory against Bologna, and 11 days later he scored his first goal for the Rossoneri in a 2–1 victory against Fiorentina at the San Siro.

Return to Barcelona
On 30 June 2017, Deulofeu returned to Barcelona, as the club activated their buy-back clause for him. On 21 October, he scored his first goal for the club as he scored the opener in the 2nd minute in a 2–0 win against Málaga.

Watford
On 29 January 2018, it was announced that Deulofeu was to join Watford on a loan deal until the end of the season. On 5 February 2018, he scored his first goal with Watford in a Premier League 4–1 win against Chelsea.

On 11 June 2018, Watford signed Deulofeu on a permanent deal for a reported fee of €13 million. He was sidelined from the last game of his loan spell until being available for selection again in early October, owing to "foot and hip problems".

On 22 February 2019, Deulofeu became the first Watford player to score a Premier League hat-trick, scoring three goals in a 5–1 win over Cardiff City.

Udinese
In October 2020, Deulofeu joined Udinese on a season-long loan. The following January  he completed a permanent transfer to the club, signing a three-and-a-half-year contract.

International career

Deulofeu played for the Spain under-17 team from 2009 to 2011, helping them finish runner-up at the 2010 UEFA European Under-17 Championship. In the latter year he was selected to the under-19s, winning two consecutive European Championships and being selected best player in the 2012 edition.

Deulofeu was selected for the senior side for the first time on 30 May 2014, as part of a 19-man squad to play a friendly against Bolivia, being given the number 7. He played the last ten minutes of the 2–0 win in Seville as a substitute for Pedro, but the following day he was not included in the squad for the 2014 FIFA World Cup.

On 12 November 2015, Deulofeu scored a hat-trick and captained the under-21 team in a 5–0 win over Georgia in Almería, for 2017 UEFA European Under-21 Championship qualification.

Winning his second senior Spain cap, Deulofeu scored his first goal for Spain against France in a friendly on 28 March 2017, after coming off the bench. However, the goal was initially ruled out for offside, but the referee consulted his video assistant, who after checking the TV replays decided the referee's assistant had made the wrong call in the first place. Deulofeu made two further appearances for Spain as a substitute in 2017, in a 2–2 friendly draw against Colombia and an 8–0 victory over Liechtenstein in 2018 FIFA World Cup qualification: the latter match marked Deulofeu's competitive international debut as well as his latest cap for Spain.

Style of play
A quick and skillful player, gifted with pace, good technique and dribbling ability, Deulofeu is capable of playing as a winger or as a forward on either flank. He is also capable of playing in a central role, seemingly operating as a lone striker, but acting instead as a false-9; he has even been deployed as an out-and-out striker on occasion, or more frequently as a second striker, due to his ability to beat opponents in one on one situations and create chances for teammates, in addition to scoring goals himself. Despite citing Ronaldinho as his main inspiration, Deulofeu's style of play is comparable to that of Cristiano Ronaldo, due to a shared direct approach. Regarded as a promising young player, in 2012, he was included by Don Balón in their list of the 101 most exciting prospects born after 1991, while in January 2014, he was named by The Observer as one of the ten most promising young players in Europe. Looking back in 2018, NBC Sports Daniel Karell said of Deulofeu: "In his younger days, the now 24-year-old winger was a dynamic and lightning-quick attacker with a central midfielder's technique to boot".

Career statistics

Club

International

As of match played 5 September 2017
Scores and results list Spain's goal tally first

Honours
Barcelona B
Copa del Rey Juvenil: 2011

Sevilla
UEFA Europa League:  2014–15

Barcelona
La Liga: 2017–18

Watford
FA Cup runner-up: 2018–19

Spain U17 
UEFA European Under-17 Championship runner-up: 2010

Spain U19
UEFA European Under-19 Championship: 2011, 2012

Spain U21
UEFA European Under-21 Championship runner-up: 2017

Individual
UEFA European Under-19 Championship Golden Player: 2012
UEFA European Under-19 Championship Team of the Tournament: 2012
Lo Stadio Player of the Month September: 2022

Notes

References

External links

1994 births
Living people
People from Selva
Sportspeople from the Province of Girona
Spanish footballers
Footballers from Catalonia
Association football wingers
Association football forwards
FC Barcelona Atlètic players
FC Barcelona players
Everton F.C. players
Sevilla FC players
A.C. Milan players
Watford F.C. players
Udinese Calcio players
Segunda División players
La Liga players
Premier League players
Serie A players
Spain youth international footballers
Spain under-21 international footballers
Spain international footballers
Catalonia international footballers
Spanish expatriate footballers
Spanish expatriate sportspeople in England
Spanish expatriate sportspeople in Italy
Expatriate footballers in England
Expatriate footballers in Italy
FA Cup Final players